The Philippine House Committee on the Welfare of Children, or House Welfare of Children Committee is a standing committee of the Philippine House of Representatives.

Jurisdiction 
As prescribed by House Rules, the committee's jurisdiction includes the following:
 All actions to ensure the availability of and continuing access of Filipino children to affordable and appropriate programs and resources that facilitate and contribute to the attainment of their welfare
 Needs, education and overall welfare of Filipino children

Members, 18th Congress

See also 
 House of Representatives of the Philippines
 List of Philippine House of Representatives committees

References

External links 
House of Representatives of the Philippines

Welfare of Children